Igor Nikolayevich Gorbatenko (born 13 February 1989) is a Russian professional footballer. He plays as an attacking midfielder or left midfielder.

Club career
He made his professional debut in the Russian Second Division in 2006 for FC Krylia Sovetov-SOK Dimitrovgrad.

In January 2015, Gorbatenko signed for FC Krylia Sovetov Samara, on an 18-month contract.

International career
Gorbatenko was one of the stars of the Russian U-17 squad that won the 2006 UEFA U-17 Championship. He was a part of the Russia U-21 side that was competing in the 2011 European Under-21 Championship qualification.

Career statistics

Club

Notes

References

External links
 
 

1989 births
People from Belgorod
Sportspeople from Belgorod Oblast
Living people
Russian footballers
Russia youth international footballers
Russia under-21 international footballers
Association football midfielders
FC Spartak Moscow players
FC Ural Yekaterinburg players
FC Dynamo Bryansk players
FC Shinnik Yaroslavl players
PFC Krylia Sovetov Samara players
FC Arsenal Tula players
Russian Premier League players
Russian First League players
Russian Second League players